"Guilty All the Same" is a song by American rock band Linkin Park. The song was  recorded by the band for their sixth studio album, The Hunting Party, serving as the third track. The track features American rapper Rakim. The track premiered on March 6, 2014, on commercial mobile service Shazam, and was released as a single by Warner Bros. Records on March 7, 2014. The song was self-produced since the band decided not to have a producer for the album.

Composition

In an interview with Radio.com, Shinoda and Bennington explained that this song "...seemed like the perfect song to reintroduce the band."

In that same interview, regarding the addition of Rakim, Shinoda wanted to surprise people and was "spitballing" the idea of getting Rakim, one of Shinoda's idols growing up, on the track. When the band's engineer revealed that he knew one of Rakim's people, he reached out to him, leading to Rakim coming over to the studio and, according to Bennington, "crush that section" (verse over the bridge). Shinoda was originally going to rap in the bridge off the song, but thought that it would be too predictable and wanted another rapper to do it instead, and managed to get into contact with Rakim through their musical engineer.

The track features a long instrumental intro and is driven by aggressive guitars and drums, with lead singer Chester Bennington using angsty yet clean vocals, while guest rapper Rakim raps his own verse over a hip hop-tinged bridge. Alternatively, it has been described as demonstrating a rap metal style similar to that of the band's earlier albums, Hybrid Theory and Meteora by Music Feeds. It has also been described as a return to their hard rock and heavy metal roots for the band by Zach McEntire of KXRK. Al Kooper observed it as "plain old heavy metal".

Reception
Tarun Mazumdar of International Business Times gave the song a positive review, claiming "the vocals nicely complement the entire instrumentation", and praises Rakim's rapping during the breakdown. Andy Walsh at Renowned for Sound gave the song 3.5 stars out of 5 stars, calling the heaviness of the song a "welcome return". He concludes with hoping it's a sign for things to come. In the track by track review by Billboard, the song is given a positive response and explained as "The fellas are justifiably psyched to have hip-hop legend Rakim on this track, so they preface his arrival with more than a minute of dramatic guitar buildup. At first, the bobbing and weaving riffage suggests a boxer readying for the bell, but then the group segues into quasi-symphonic metal mode, and we're galloping into Bennington's verses."

Music video
The music video for "Guilty All the Same" is a collaboration between Linkin Park and Microsoft's Project Spark, giving the fans the opportunity of editing it and remixing it as they will. In Linkin Park's version of the game, the protagonist is a character haunted by guilt. The player navigates the character through a dark, slightly sinister environment that threatens to devour him as he tries to flee from the forces of his own guilt. The level resembles a mashup between the racing mechanic of Temple Run and the noir art style of Badland. The better the player performs, the richer the soundtrack for the song.

As of December 2022, the music video for "Guilty All the Same" has over 5 million views on YouTube.

Track listing

Personnel

Linkin Park
 Chester Bennington – lead vocals
 Mike Shinoda – piano, rhythm guitar, keyboards, programming
 Brad Delson – lead guitar, programming
 Rob Bourdon – drums, percussion
 Dave "Phoenix" Farrell – bass guitar, backing vocals 
 Joe Hahn ("Mr. Hahn") –  samples, programming

Additional musicians
 Rakim – rap vocals

Charts

Weekly charts

Year-end charts

Release history

References

External links
 
 Linkin Park "Guilty All the Same" lyrics

2014 songs
2014 singles
Linkin Park songs
Rakim songs
Songs written by Mike Shinoda
Warner Records singles
American hard rock songs
American heavy metal songs